Smeafield railway station served the farmstead of Smeafield, Northumberland, England from 1871 to 1930 on the East Coast Main Line.

History 
The station was shown on the NER timetable of February 1871 by the North Eastern Railway, which was the station's private use for market stops on Tuesdays and Saturdays but the station was publicly used in January 1875 when it first appeared in the Bradshaw timetable. The station was situated 500 yards east of the A1. The station wasn't used much during its lifespan and it disappeared from the timetable at the end of 1929. The station later closed to passengers on 1 May 1930 but the date of complete closure of the station is unknown, although it may have closed on the same date due to the station not having a coal or goods depot.

References

External links 

Disused railway stations in Northumberland
1871 establishments in England
1930 disestablishments in England
Former North Eastern Railway (UK) stations
Railway stations in Great Britain opened in 1871
Railway stations in Great Britain closed in 1930